Trouping with Ellen is a 1924 American silent comedy film starring Basil Rathbone, Gaston Glass, Helene Chadwick, and Mary Thurman. Based on a short story by Earl Derr Biggers that appeared in The Saturday Evening Post, this was Rathbone's first American production.

Cast

Preservation
With no copies of Trouping with Ellen located in any film archives, it is a lost film.

References

External links

1924 films
1924 drama films
American silent feature films
American drama films
American black-and-white films
Lost American films
Producers Distributing Corporation films
Films with screenplays by Gerald Duffy
1924 lost films
Lost drama films
1920s English-language films
1920s American films
Silent American drama films